The Greenhouse Gas Pollution Pricing Act is a Canadian federal law establishing a set of minimum national standards for carbon pricing in Canada to meet emission reduction targets under the Paris Agreement. It was passed as Part 5 of the Budget Implementation Act, 2018, No. 1 – an omnibus budget bill – during the 42nd Parliament of Canada. The law came into force immediately upon receiving royal assent on June 21, 2018.

On March 25, 2021, the Supreme Court of Canada rejected the 2019 appeal of the provinces of Alberta, Ontario, and Saskatchewan and ruled in Reference re Greenhouse Gas Pollution Pricing Act that the GGPPA was constitutional. Commentators had varying reactions to who the ruling benefited most politically, with some stating that it represented a blow to the group of conservative premiers that made opposition to carbon pricing a central aspect of their policies.

Provisions
The aim of the legislation is to put a price on all greenhouse gases that play a significant role in trapping heat in the atmosphere through binding "minimum national standards" on the federal government and all of the provinces and territories of Canada. The standards on pricing are divided into two parts: a regulatory charge on carbon-based fuels and an output-based emissions trading system for polluting industries.

The GGPPA requires that all provincial and territorial governments establish a pollution pricing scheme that meets the national minimum price per tonne of carbon dioxide equivalent and established emission caps under the act. A federally-managed backstop system under GGPPA applies in provinces or territories that do not have a system that meets the criteria or if the province or territory request the federal system be used. , five provinces and two territories are under the federal pricing system for one or both aspects of pollution pricing. The provinces of Ontario, Manitoba, New Brunswick, and Saskatchewan are under both the federal fuel charge and industrial emissions trading system; the territories of Yukon and Nunavut are voluntarily under both systems; and Prince Edward Island is voluntarily under the federal pricing system for industrial emissions trading only. Following the repeal of Alberta's provincial fuel levy on May 30, 2019, the federal fuel charge system will be applied to Alberta beginning January 1, 2020.

All funds collected under the federal system are returned to the province or territory where they are collected. In cases where the provincial or territorial government requested to be part of the federal system, such as Yukon (fuel charge and emissions trading) or Prince Edward Island (emissions trading only), the funds are remitted to the government of that province or territory. Residents of provinces and territories that are under the federal system due to not implementing a pollution pricing system, such as Ontario and New Brunswick, receive their share of the collected charges directly as a tax-free Climate Action Incentive Payment paid out four times per year (until 2022 the CAI was a refundable tax credit on the federal income tax for residents of these provinces intead). Approximately ten percent of the money collected from these "backstop provinces" is separately distributed by the federal government for environmental initiatives in those provinces, such as green retrofits of public schools.

Constitutional challenges

The provisions of the GGPPA were opposed by the governments of Saskatchewan and Ontario, and challenged in provincial courts. They were joined in their legal challenges by several others. For example, under Premier Blaine Higgs, the New Brunswick Attorney General submitted his intention to intervene in Saskatchewan's court challenge of the federal government's carbon pricing plan.

Saskatchewan 
On May 3, 2019, the Court of Appeal for Saskatchewan ruled in favour of the federal government in a 155-page 3–2 split decision that concluded that, "The Greenhouse Gas Pollution Pricing Act is not unconstitutional either in whole or in part." The federal government argued successfully that the Act was a legitimate exercise of Parliament’s "Peace, Order, and good Government" (POGG) power. Moe said he would bring the case before the Supreme Court of Canada.

On May 31, 2019, Premier Scott Moe filed his appeal of the Saskatchewan decision to the Supreme Court of Canada. He hopes the case will be heard in the fall of 2019.

Ontario 
Following the election of a Progressive Conservative Party government under Doug Ford in the 2018 Ontario general election, Ontario cancelled its participation in the Western Climate Initiative cap-and-trade system. For this reason, the province was deemed non-compliant with the minimum national standards set by the GGPPA and both backstop federal pricing systems were implemented for Ontario on April 1, 2019.

Ontario's Environment Minister Rod Phillips and Attorney General Caroline Mulroney announced a $30 million plan on August 2, 2018, to challenge the constitutionality of the GGPPA in the Court of Appeal for Ontario. The court challenge was opposed by all three of the province's opposition parties. Eighteen parties were granted intervenor status. Intervenors supporting the Ontario government's challenge included the conservative Canadian Taxpayers Federation and Alberta's United Conservative Party (at the time forming Alberta's Official Opposition), while the Assembly of First Nations and environmentalist groups like the David Suzuki Foundation were among the intervenors supporting the GGPPA's constitutionality.

The Court of Appeal for Ontario ruled by a four to one margin on June 28, 2019, that the Greenhouse Gas Pollution Pricing Act was constitutional. Specifically, writing for the majority, Chief Justice George Strathy ruled that the law was within federal jurisdiction "to legislate in relation to matters of 'national concern' under the 'Peace, Order, and good Government'  clause of s. 91 of the Constitution Act, 1867."

Justice Grant Huscroft wrote in his dissenting opinion that the decision of the majority could have repercussions to the existing division of powers between the provinces and the federal government. He noted: "federalism is no constitutional nicety; it is a defining feature of the Canadian constitutional order that governs the way in which even the most serious problems must be addressed" and "in effect, [the federal government] has asked the court to sanction a change to the constitutional order – to increase Parliament's lawmaking authority while diminishing that of the provincial legislatures, and to do so on a permanent basis." Huscroft's dissent was described as "traditionalist" in its view of the division of powers and compared to Gérard La Forest, a former puis-ne on the Supreme Court of Canada, by former Attorney-General Peter MacKay.

The Ontario government filed an appeal of the decision with the Supreme Court of Canada on August 28, 2019.

Supreme Court of Canada 

On March 25, 2021, the Supreme Court of Canada ruled that the Greenhouse Gas Pollution Pricing Act is constitutional.

See also
 R v Crown Zellerbach Canada Ltd, [1988] 1 S.C.R. 401
 Reference Re Anti-Inflation Act, [1976]

Notes

References

2018 establishments in Canada
2018 in Canadian law
2018 in the environment
42nd Canadian Parliament
Environmental tax
Carbon finance
Climate change in Canada
Emissions reduction
Emissions trading
Environmental law in Canada
Taxation in Canada